Sydney Theatre Company (STC) is an Australian theatre company based in Sydney, New South Wales. The company performs in The Wharf Theatre at Dawes Point in The Rocks area of Sydney as well as the Roslyn Packer Theatre (formerly Sydney Theatre) and the Sydney Opera House Drama Theatre.

History

Sydney Theatre Company was formed in December 1978, following the closure of the Old Tote Theatre Company the month before. The then premier, Neville Wran, approached Elizabeth Butcher who had been seconded from the National Institute of Dramatic Art to administer the Old Tote and asked her to set up a new state theatre company to perform in the drama theatre of the Sydney Opera House. Butcher established its legal identity and managerial structure and proposed the name "Sydney Theatre Company"{. With John Clark (director of NIDA) as the artistic adviser of the first season, five theatre companies were invited to produce six plays to be presented by STC as the 1979 interim season in the drama theatre. The first production, by the Paris Company, was A Cheery Soul by Patrick White (an  Australian Nobel Laureate for Literature), directed by Jim Sharman and featuring Robyn Nevin as Miss Docker.

In June 1979, Richard Wherrett, then one of Nimrod Theatre's co-artistic directors, was appointed artistic director of STC to plan and organise activities for the 1980 season. The first STC-produced play was The Sunny South (1 January 1980) by George Darrell with music by Terence Clarke, directed by Richard Wherrett and assisted by John Gaden.

In its early years the company operated out of several rented premises around the city, producing 38 productions in five separate venues. Elizabeth Butcher, STC administrator, was given the task of finding one location that could house all the activities of the company, and a theatre. After an extensive search, Butcher had the vision to propose the derelict Walsh Bay Wharf 4/5 as STC's new home, immediately envisaging the capacity of the building to fulfil all requirements of space, location and additional venue. On 12 September 1983, the premier, Neville Wran, announced that the state government had approved the expenditure of $3.5 million to finance the project. The 60-year-old ironbark timber wharf warehouse was converted into premises suitable for creating, producing, performing and enjoying theatre.

The Wharf was officially handed over to STC in a plaque-unveiling ceremony on 13 December 1984. In 1985, The Wharf, by architects Vivian Fraser in association with NSW Govt Architect JW Thomson, won the Sir John Sulman Medal awarded by the Royal Australian Institute of Architects (NSW Chapter) for a work of excellence in public and commercial architecture. The first STC production in The Wharf Theatre (now Wharf 1), 17 January 1985, was Late Arrivals by Pamela van Amstel and directed by Wayne Harrison in his directorial debut. (Harrison went on to become the second artistic director of the company, in 1990.) The play was part of a season of one-act plays called Shorts at the Wharf.

Other performing arts companies and organisations later moved into the premises at The Wharf, including Sydney Dance Company, Ausdance, Sydney Philharmonia Choirs, Gondwana Choirs, Sydney Children's Choir, Australian Theatre for Young People, and Bangarra Dance Theatre. Nearly 25 years later The Wharf was presented the RAIA 25-Year Award for Enduring Architecture.

Directors working regularly for STC include Gale Edwards, Barrie Kosky, David Berthold, Neil Armfield, Benedict Andrews and Kip Williams. Many Australian actors who would later find wider success, such as Hugo Weaving, Geoffrey Rush, Cate Blanchett, Jacqueline McKenzie, Richard Roxburgh and Toni Collette, established their careers in STC productions.

Jo Dyer was executive producer of STC for ten years.

Artistic directors

Greening the Wharf
The Sydney Theatre Company operates out of a heritage site of the wharf area of Sydney Harbour. Under the leadership of Blanchett and Upton, STC initiated a comprehensive large scale environmental program called Greening the Wharf, investing in solar energy, rainwater harvesting, energy efficiency measures and best practice waste management. The program goes beyond infrastructure projects to include employees, environmentally responsible theatre production, community engagement and education. The program won two Green Globe Awards.

Awards and nominations

Helpmann Awards
The Helpmann Awards is an awards show, celebrating live entertainment and performing arts in Australia, presented by industry group Live Performance Australia since 2001. Note: 2020 and 2021 were cancelled due to the COVID-19 pandemic.
 

! 
|-
| rowspan="4"| 2001
|Benedict Andrews – La Dispute (Sydney Theatre Company)
| Helpmann Award for Best Direction of a Play
| 
| rowspan="4"| 
|-
|Robyn Nevin – A Cheery Soul (Company B Belvoir and Sydney Theatre Company)
| Helpmann Award for Best Female Actor in a Play
| 
|-
| Stephen Page – The Sunshine Club (Sydney Theatre Company)
| Helpmann Award for Best Choreography in a Musical
| 
|-
| Trudy Dalgleish – The White Devil (Sydney Theatre Company)
| Helpmann Award for Best Lighting
| 
|-
| rowspan="6"| 2002
| Three Sisters (Sydney Theatre Company)
| Helpmann Award for Best Play
| 
| rowspan="6"| 
|-
|Essie Davis – The School for Scandal (Sydney Theatre Company)
| Best Female Actor in a Play
| 
|-
|Peter Carroll – The Christian Brothers (Sydney Theatre Company)
| Helpmann Award for Best Male Actor in a Play
| 
|-
| Nick Enright – A Man with Five Children (Sydney Theatre Company)
| Helpmann Award for Best New Australian Work
| 
|-
|Nigel Levings – The Old Masters (Sydney Theatre Company)
| rowspan="2"| Best Lighting
| 
|-
|[ John Rayment – Up for Grabs (Sydney Theatre Company)
| 
|-
| rowspan="6"| 2003
| Copenhagen – Sydney Theatre Company
| Best Play
| 
| rowspan="6"| 
|-
| Deborah Mailman – Seven Stages of Grieving (Sydney Theatre Company)
| rowspan="2"| Best Female Actor in a Play
| 
|-
|Miranda Otto – A Doll's House (Sydney Theatre Company)
| 
|-
|Deborah Kennedy – Soulmate (Sydney Theatre Company)
|Helpmann Award for Best Female Actor in a Supporting Role in a Play
| 
|-
|Peter Carroll – Endgame (Sydney Theatre Company)
|Best Male Actor in a Supporting Role in a Play
| 
|-
| Andree Greenwell – Volpone (Sydney Theatre Company)
|Helpmann Award for Best Original Score
| 
|-
| rowspan="3"| 2004
|Judy Davis – Victory (Sydney Theatre Company)
| Best Female Actor in a Play
| 
| rowspan="3"| 
|-
| Amber McMahon – The Snow Queen (Windmill Performing Arts and Sydney Theatre Company)
|Best Female Actor in a Supporting Role in a Play
| 
|-
| Peter Carroll – The Republic of Myopia (Sydney Theatre Company)
|Best Male Actor in a Supporting Role in a Play
| 
|-
| rowspan="3"| 2005
| Hedda Gabler (Sydney Theatre Company)
| Best Play
| 
| rowspan="3"| 
|-
| Michael Blakemore – Democracy (Sydney Theatre Company)
| Best Direction of a Play
| 
|-
| Zoe Carides – Influence (Sydney Theatre Company)
|Best Female Actor in a Supporting Role in a Play
| 
|-
| rowspan="5"| 2006
|Jennifer Flowers – Doubt: A Parable (Sydney Theatre Company)
| Best Female Actor in a Play
| 
| rowspan="5"| 
|-
| Robert Menzies – Julius Caesar (Sydney Theatre Company)
| Best Male Actor in a Play
| 
|-
| Hamish Michael – Two Brothers (Melbourne Theatre Company & Sydney Theatre Company)
| Best Male Actor in a Supporting Role in a Play
| 
|-
| Robyn Nevin – Summer Rain (Sydney Theatre Company)
| Helpmann Award for Best Direction of a Musical
| 
|-
| Stella and the Moon Man – Kim Carpenter's Theatre of Image with Sydney Theatre Company and Australian Youth Orchestra
| Helpmann Award for Best Presentation for Children
| 
|-
| rowspan="4"| 2007
| The Lost Echo (Sydney Theatre Company)
| rowspan="2"| Best Play
| 
| rowspan="4"| 
|-
| The Season at Sarsaparilla (Sydney Theatre Company)
| 
|-
|Pamela Rabe – Mother Courage and Her Children (Sydney Theatre Company)
| Best Female Actor in a Play
| 
|-
| Jefferson Mays – I Am My Own Wife (Melbourne Theatre Company, Sydney Theatre Company and Hothouse Theatre)
| Best Male Actor in a Play
| 
|-
| rowspan="3"| 2008
|Susan Prior – Riflemind (Sydney Theatre Company)
| rowspan="2"| Best Female Actor in a Supporting Role in a Play
| 
| rowspan="3"| 
|-
| Alison Whyte – Don's Party (Melbourne Theatre Company and Sydney Theatre Company)
| 
|-
| Travis McMahon – Don's Party (Melbourne Theatre Company and Sydney Theatre Company)
| Best Male Actor in a Supporting Role in a Play
| 
|-
| rowspan="13"| 2009
| War of the Roses – Sydney Theatre Company (in association with the Sydney Festival and Perth International Arts Festival)
| rowspan="2"| Best Play
| 
| rowspan="13"|  
|-
| Women of Troy (Sydney Theatre Company)
| 
|-
|Benedict Andrews – War of the Roses (Sydney Theatre Company)
| rowspan="2"| Best Direction of a Play
| 
|-
| Barrie Kosky – Women of Troy (Sydney Theatre Company)
| 
|-
| Robyn Nevin – Women of Troy (Sydney Theatre Company)
| rowspan="3"|  Best Female Actor in a Play
| 
|-
| Pamela Rabe – War of the Roses (Sydney Theatre Company)
| 
|-
| Cate Blanchett – War of the Roses (Sydney Theatre Company)
| 
|-
| Robert Menzies – War of the Roses (Sydney Theatre Company)
|Best Male Actor in a Play
| 
|-
| Marta Dusseldorp – War of the Roses (Sydney Theatre Company)
|Best Female Actor in a Supporting Role in a Play
| 
|-
| Ewen Leslie – War of the Roses (Sydney Theatre Company)
| Best Male Actor in a Supporting Role in a Play
| 
|-
| Robert Cousins – War of the Roses (Sydney Theatre Company)
| Best Scenic Design
| 
|-
| Max Lyandvert – War of the Roses (Sydney Theatre Company)
| Best Sound Design
| 
|-
| Nick Schlieper – War of the Roses (Sydney Theatre Company)
| Best Lighting Design
| 
|-
| rowspan="2"| 2010
|Kathryn Hunter – Kafka's Monkey (Arts Projects Australia in association with Sydney Theatre Company and Malthouse Theatre)
| Best Female Actor in a Play
| 
| rowspan="2"| 
|-
| Paul Charlier – A Streetcar Named Desire (Sydney Theatre Company)
| Best Sound Design
| 
|-
| rowspan="7"| 2011
| Uncle Vanya – Sydney Theatre Company (in association with Bell Shakespeare)
| Best Play
| 
| rowspan="7"| 
|-
| Cate Blanchett – Uncle Vanya (Sydney Theatre Company)
| rowspan="2"| Best Female Actor in a Play
| 
|-
| Robyn Nevin – Long Day's Journey into Night (Sydney Theatre Company and Artists Repertory Theatre)
| 
|-
| Helen Thomson – In the Next Room (or The Vibrator Play)  (Sydney Theatre Company)
|Best Female Actor in a Play
| 
|-
| Richard Roxburgh – Uncle Vanya (Sydney Theatre Company)
|Best Male Actor in a Play
| 
|-
| John Bell – Uncle Vanya (Sydney Theatre Company)
|Best Male Actor in a Supporting Role in a Play
| 
|-
| Nick Schlieper – Baal (Sydney Theatre Company and Malthouse Melbourne)
| Best Lighting Design
| 
|-
| rowspan="4"| 2012
|Benedict Andrews – Gross und Klein (Big and Small) (Sydney Theatre Company)
| Best Play
| 
| rowspan="4"| 
|-
| Bille Brown – The Histrionic (Malthouse Theatre & Sydney Theatre Company)
| Best Male Actor in a Play
| 
|-
| Justine Clarke – Les Liaisons dDangereuses (Sydney Theatre Company)
| rowspan="2"| Best Female Actor in a Supporting Role in a Play
| 
|-
| Miranda Otto – The White Guard (Sydney Theatre Company)
| 
|-
| rowspan="7"| 2013
| The Secret River (Sydney Theatre Company)
| Best Play
| 
| rowspan="7"| 
|-
| Neil Armfield – The Secret River (Sydney Theatre Company)
| Best Direction of a Play
| 
|-
|Helen Thomson – Mrs. Warren's Profession (Sydney Theatre Company)
| Best Female Actor in a Play
| 
|-
| Nathaniel Dean – The Secret River (Sydney Theatre Company)
| Best Male Actor in a Play
| 
|-
| Valerie Bader – Australia Day (Sydney Theatre Company and Melbourne Theatre Company)
| rowspan="2"| Best Female Actor in a Supporting Role in a Play
| 
|-
| Miranda Tapsell – The Secret River (Sydney Theatre Company)
| 
|-
| Colin Moody – The Secret River (Sydney Theatre Company)
| Best Male Actor in a Supporting Role in a Play
| 
|-
| rowspan="9"| 2014
| Waiting for Godot (Sydney Theatre Company)
| Best Play
| 
| rowspan="9"| 
|-
| Andrew Upton – Waiting for Godot (Sydney Theatre Company)
| Best Direction of a Play
| 
|-
|Cate Blanchett – The Maids (Sydney Theatre Company)
| Best Female Actor in a Play
| 
|-
| Richard Roxburgh – Waiting for Godot (Sydney Theatre Company)
| rowspan="2"| Best Male Actor in a Play
| 
|-
| Paul Blackwell – Vere (Faith) (State Theatre Company of South Australia and Sydney Theatre Company)
| 
|-
| Elizabeth Debicki – The Maids (Sydney Theatre Company)
| Best Female Actor in a Supporting Role in a Play
| 
|-
| Luke Mullins – Waiting for Godot (Sydney Theatre Company)
| rowspan="2"| Best Male Actor in a Supporting Role in a Play
| 
|-
| Ewen Leslie – Rosencrantz and Guildenstern Are Dead (Sydney Theatre Company)
| 
|-
| Storm Boy – (with Barking Gecko Theatre Company) 
| Best Presentation for Children
| 
|-
| rowspan="14"| 2015
| Calpurnia Descending (with Malthouse Theatre)
| rowspan="3"| Best Play
| 
| rowspan="14"| 
|-
| Endgame (Sydney Theatre Company)
| 
|-
| Suddenly Last Summer (Sydney Theatre Company)
| 
|-
| Kip Williams – Suddenly Last Summer (Sydney Theatre Company)
| rowspan="3"| Best Direction of a Play
| 
|-
| Sarah Goodes – Switzerland (Sydney Theatre Company)
| 
|-
| Andrew Upton – Endgame (Sydney Theatre Company)
| 
|-
| Robyn Nevin – Suddenly Last Summer (Sydney Theatre Company)
| rowspan="2"| Best Female Actor in a Play
| 
|-
| Sarah Peirse – Switzerland (Sydney Theatre Company)
| 
|-
| Hugo Weaving – Endgame (Sydney Theatre Company)
| Best Male Actor in a Play
| 
|-
| Helen Thomson – After Dinner (Sydney Theatre Company)
| rowspan="2"| Best Female in a Supporting Role in a Play
| 
|-
| Sarah Peirse – Endgame (Sydney Theatre Company)
| 
|-
| Bruce Spence – Endgame (Sydney Theatre Company)
| rowspan="2"| Best Male Actor in a Supporting Role in a Play
| 
|-
| Glenn Hazeldine – After Dinner (Sydney Theatre Company)
| 
|-
| Nick Schlieper – Macbeth (Sydney Theatre Company)
| Best Lighting Design
| 
|-
| rowspan="4"| 2016
| Kip Williams – Love and Information (Sydney Theatre Company and Malthouse Theatre)
| Best Direction of a Play
| 
| rowspan="4"| 
|-
|Cate Blanchett –  The Present (Sydney Theatre Company)
| Best Female Actor in a Play
| 
|-
| Sarah Peirse – The Golden Age (Sydney Theatre Company)
| Best Female Actor in a Supporting Role in a Play
| 
|-
| Mark Leonard Winter – King Lear (Sydney Theatre Company)
| Best Male Actor in a Supporting Role in a Play
| 
|-
| rowspan="1"| 2017
| Kip Williams – Chimerica (Sydney Theatre Company)
| Best Direction of a Play
| 
| rowspan="1"| 
|-
| rowspan="15"| 2018
| The Children – (Melbourne Theatre Company and Sydney Theatre Company)
| rowspan="3"| Best Play
| 
| rowspan="14"|
|-
| Black is the New White (Sydney Theatre Company)
| 
|-
| The Resistible Rise of Arturo Ui (Sydney Theatre Company)
| 
|-
|Sarah Goodes – The Children – (Melbourne Theatre Company and Sydney Theatre Company)
| rowspan="3"| Best Direction
| 
|-
| Kip Williams – Cloud Nine (Sydney Theatre Company)
| 
|-
| Kip Williams – The Resistible Rise of Arturo Ui (Sydney Theatre Company)
| 
|-
| Pamela Rabe – The Children – (Melbourne Theatre Company and Sydney Theatre Company)
| rowspan="2"| Best Female Actor in a Play
| 
|-
| Sarah Peirse – The Children – (Melbourne Theatre Company and Sydney Theatre Company)
| 
|-
| Hugo Weaving – The Resistible Rise of Arturo Ui (Sydney Theatre Company)
| rowspan="2"| Best Male Actor in a Play
| 
|-
| John Bell – The Father (Sydney Theatre Company and Melbourne Theatre Company)
| 
|-
| Anita Hegh – The Resistible Rise of Arturo Ui (Sydney Theatre Company)
| rowspan="2"| Best Female Actor in a Supporting Role in a Play
| 
|-
| Kate Box – Top Girls (Sydney Theatre Company)
| 
|-
|  Peter Carroll – The Resistible Rise of Arturo Ui (Sydney Theatre Company)
| rowspan="2"| Best Male Actor in a Supporting Role in a Play
| 
|-
| Colin Moody – The Resistible Rise of Arturo Ui (Sydney Theatre Company)
| 
|-
| Muriel's Wedding The Musical – Sydney Theatre Company and Global Creatures
| Best Musical
| 
|-
| rowspan="14"| 2019
| Blackie Blackie Brown: The Traditional Owner of Death (with Malthouse Theatre)
| rowspan="2"| Best Play
| 
| rowspan="14"| 
|-
| The Harp in the South: Part One and Part Two (Sydney Theatre Company)
| 
|-
|Declan Green – Blackie Blackie Brown: The Traditional Owner of Death (with Malthouse Theatre)
| rowspan="3"|  | Best Direction of a Play
| 
|-
| Imara Savage – Saint Joan (Sydney Theatre Company)
| 
|-
| Kip Williams – The Harp in the South: Part One and Part Two (Sydney Theatre Company)
| 
|-
| Helen Thomson – Mary Stuart (Sydney Theatre Company)
| rowspan="2"| Best Female Actor in a Play
| 
|-
|Sarah Snook – Saint Joan (Sydney Theatre Company)
| 
|-
| Wayne Blair – The Long Forgotten Dream (Sydney Theatre Company)
| Best Male Actor in a Play
| 
|-
| Helen Thomson – The Harp in the South: Part One and Part Two (Sydney Theatre Company)
| Best Female Actor in a Supporting Role in a Play
| 
|-
| Ash Flanders – Blackie Blackie Brown: The Traditional Owner of Death (Sydney Theatre Company)
| Best Male Actor in a Supporting Role in a Play
| 
|}

See also

 Culture of Sydney
 Wharf Revue

References

Bibliography

External links
 Sydney Theatre Company website
 Greening the Wharf project video explanation

Theatre in Sydney
Theatre companies in Australia
Companies based in Sydney
Sydney Opera House